Glanzmann's thrombasthenia is an abnormality of the platelets. It is an extremely rare coagulopathy (bleeding disorder due to a blood abnormality), in which the platelets contain defective or low levels of glycoprotein IIb/IIIa (GpIIb/IIIa), which is a receptor for fibrinogen. As a result, no fibrinogen bridging of platelets to other platelets can occur, and the bleeding time is significantly prolonged.

Signs and symptoms
Characteristically, there is increased mucosal bleeding:
 heavy menstrual bleeding
 easy bruising
 nosebleeds
 Bleeding from the gums
 gastrointestinal bleeding
 postpartum bleeding
 increased postoperative bleeding.

The bleeding tendency is variable but may be severe. Bleeding into the joints, particularly spontaneous bleeds, are very rare, in contrast to the hemophilias. Platelet numbers and morphology are normal. Platelet aggregation is normal with ristocetin, but impaired with other agonists such as ADP, thrombin, collagen, or epinephrine.

Cause
Glanzmann's thrombasthenia can be inherited in an autosomal recessive manner or acquired as an autoimmune disorder.

The bleeding tendency in Glanzmann's thrombasthenia is variable, some individuals having minimal bruising, while others have frequent, severe, potentially fatal hemorrhages. Moreover, platelet αIIbβ3 levels correlate poorly with hemorrhagic severity, as virtually undetectable αIIbβ3 levels can correlate with negligible bleeding symptoms, and 10%–15% levels can correlate with severe bleeding. Unidentified factors other than the platelet defect itself may have important roles.

Pathophysiology
Glanzmann's thrombasthenia is associated with abnormal integrin αIIbβ3, formerly known as glycoprotein IIb/IIIa (GpIIb/IIIa), which is an integrin  aggregation receptor on platelets. This receptor is activated when the platelet is stimulated by ADP, epinephrine, collagen, or thrombin. GpIIb/IIIa is essential to blood coagulation since the activated receptor has the ability to bind fibrinogen (as well as von Willebrand factor, fibronectin, and vitronectin), which is required for fibrinogen-dependent platelet-platelet interaction (aggregation). Understanding of the role of GpIIb/IIIa in Glanzmann's thrombasthenia led to the development of GpIIb/IIIa inhibitors, a class of powerful antiplatelet agents.

Diagnosis
Light transmission aggregometry is widely accepted as the gold standard diagnostic tool for assessing platelet function, and a result of absent aggregation with any agonist except ristocetin is highly specific for Glanzmann's thrombasthenia. Following is a table comparing its result with other platelet aggregation disorders:

Treatment
Therapy involves both preventive measures and treatment of specific bleeding episodes.
 Dental hygiene lessens gingival bleeding
 Avoidance of antiplatelet agents such as aspirin and other anti-inflammatory drugs (NSAIDs) such as ibuprofen and naproxen, and anticoagulants
  Iron or folate supplementation may be necessary if excessive or prolonged bleeding has caused anemia
 Hepatitis B vaccine
 Antifibrinolytic drugs such as tranexamic acid or ε-aminocaproic acid (Amicar)
 Desmopressin (DDAVP) does not normalize the bleeding time in Glanzmann's thrombasthenia but anecdotally improves hemostasis
 Hormonal contraceptives to control excessive menstrual bleeding
 Topical agents such as gelfoam, fibrin sealants, polyethylene glycol polymers, custom dental splints
 Platelet transfusions (only if bleeding is severe; risk of platelet alloimmunization)
 Recombinant factor VIIa, AryoSeven or NovoSeven FDA approved this drug for the treatment of the disease in July 2014.
 Hematopoietic stem cell transplantation (HSCT) for severe recurrent hemorrhages

Eponym
It is named after Eduard Glanzmann (1887-1959), the Swiss pediatrician who originally described it.

History
The subsequent studies, following Eduard Glanzmann's  description of hemorrhagic symptoms and "weak platelets" demonstrated that these patients have prolonged bleeding times and their platelets failed to aggregate in response to activation. In the mid-1970s, Nurden and Caen and Phillips and colleagues discovered that thrombasthenic platelets are deficient in integrins  αIIbβ3.

See also
 Platelet
 Coagulation
 Bernard-Soulier syndrome

References

External links 

Autosomal recessive disorders
Coagulopathies
Rare diseases